Elections to Tameside Council were held on 4 May 2007. One third of the council was up for election, with each successful candidate to serve a four-year term of office, expiring in 2011. The Labour Party retained overall control of the council.

After the election, the composition of the council was
 Labour 45
 Conservative 8
 Liberal Democrats Audenshaw Focus Team 1
 Others 3

Election result

Ward results

Ashton Hurst ward

Ashton St. Michael's ward

Ashton Waterloo ward

Audenshaw ward

Denton North East ward

Denton South ward

Denton West ward

Droylsden East ward

Droylsden West ward

Dukinfield ward

Dukinfield / Stalybridge ward

Hyde Godley ward

Hyde Newton ward

Hyde Werneth ward

Longdendale ward

Mossley ward

St. Peters ward

Stalybridge North ward

Stalybridge South ward

References
 Details Official Tameside Council Election page

2007 English local elections
2007
2000s in Greater Manchester